Venice is a neighborhood of the city of Los Angeles within the Westside region of Los Angeles County, California.

Venice was founded by Abbot Kinney in 1905 as a seaside resort town. It was an independent city until 1926, when it was annexed by Los Angeles. Venice is known for its canals, a beach, and Ocean Front Walk, a   pedestrian promenade that features performers, fortune-tellers, and vendors.

History

19th century
In 1839, a region called La Ballona that included the southern parts of Venice, was granted by the Mexican government to Ygnacio and Augustin Machado and Felipe and Tomas Talamantes, giving them title to Rancho La Ballona. Later this became part of Port Ballona.

Founding

He and his partner Francis Ryan had bought  of ocean-front property south of Santa Monica in 1891. They built a resort town on the north end of the property, called Ocean Park, which was soon annexed to Santa Monica. After Ryan died, Kinney and his new partners continued building south of Navy Street. After the partnership dissolved in 1904, Kinney, who had won the marshy land on the south end of the property in a coin flip with his former partners, began to build a seaside resort like the namesake Italian city.

When Venice of America opened on July 4, 1905, Kinney had dug several miles of canals to drain the marshes for his residential area, built a  pier with an auditorium, ship restaurant, and dance hall, constructed a hot salt-water plunge, and built a block-long arcaded business street with Venetian architecture. Kinney hired artist Felix Peano to design the columns of the buildings. Included in the capitals are several faces, modeled after Kinney and a woman named Nettie Bouck.

Tourists, mostly arriving on the "Red Cars" of the Pacific Electric Railway from Los Angeles and Santa Monica, then rode the Venice Miniature Railway and gondolas to tour the town. The biggest attraction was Venice's  gently-sloping beach. Cottages and housekeeping tents were available for rent.

The population (3,119 residents in 1910) soon exceeded 10,000; the town drew 50,000 to 150,000 tourists on weekends.

Amusement pier

Attractions on the Kinney Pier became more amusement-oriented by 1910, when a Venice Miniature Railway, Aquarium, Virginia Reel, Whip, Racing Derby, and other rides and game booths were added. Since the business district was allotted only three one-block-long streets, and the City Hall was more than a mile away, other competing business districts developed. Unfortunately, this created a fractious political climate. Kinney, however, governed with an iron hand and kept things in check. When he died in November 1920, Venice became harder to govern. With the amusement pier burning six weeks later in December 1920, and Prohibition (which had begun the previous January), the town's tax revenue was severely affected.

The Kinney family rebuilt their amusement pier quickly to compete with Ocean Park's Pickering Pleasure Pier and the new Sunset Pier. When it opened it had two roller coasters, a new Racing Derby, a Noah's Ark, a Mill Chutes, and many other rides. By 1925, with the addition of a third coaster, a tall Dragon Slide, Fun House, and Flying Circus aerial ride, it was the finest amusement pier on the West Coast. Several hundred thousand tourists visited on weekends. In 1923, Charles Lick built the Lick Pier at Navy Street in Venice, adjacent to the Ocean Park Pier at Pier Avenue in Ocean Park. Another pier was planned for Venice in 1925 at Leona Street (now Washington Street). For the amusement of the public, Kinney hired aviators to do aerial stunts over the beach. One of them, movie aviator and Venice airport owner B. H. DeLay, implemented the first lighted airport in the United States on DeLay Field (previously known as Ince Field). After a marine rescue attempt was thwarted, he organized the first aerial police force in the nation. DeLay performed many of the world's first aerial stunts for motion pictures in Venice.

Politics
By 1925, Venice's politics had become unmanageable because its roads, water and sewage systems badly needed repair and expansion to keep up with its growing population. When it was proposed that Venice consolidate with Los Angeles, the board of trustees voted to hold an election. Consolidation was approved at the election in November 1925, and Venice was merged with Los Angeles in 1926.

Many streets were paved in 1929, following a three-year court battle led by canal residents. Afterward, the Department of Recreation and Parks intended to close three amusement piers, but had to wait until the first of the tidelands leases expired in 1946.

Oil
In 1929, oil was discovered south of Washington Street on the Venice Peninsula, now known as the Marina Peninsula neighborhood of Los Angeles. Within two years, 450 oil wells covered the area, and drilling waste clogged the remaining waterways. The short-lived boom provided needed income to the community, which otherwise suffered during the Great Depression. Most of the wells had been capped by the 1970s, and the last wells, near the Venice Pavilion, were capped in 1991.

Neglect
After annexation, the city of Los Angeles showed little interest in maintaining the unusual neighborhood. Most of the canals were filled in and paved over, and the former lagoon became a traffic circle. The neighborhood lacked the automobile-centric, homogeneous character that the city sought to cultivate in the post-World War II era, and was perceived as a dated, obsolete remnant of earlier decades' land speculation.

Los Angeles had neglected Venice so long that, by the 1950s the neglect had led to the area being labeled the "Slum by the Sea". With the exception of new police and fire stations in 1930, the city spent little on improvements after annexation. The city did not pave Trolleyway (Pacific Avenue) until 1954 when county and state funds became available. Low rents for run-down bungalows attracted predominantly European immigrants (including a substantial number of Holocaust survivors) and young counterculture artists, poets, and writers. The Beat Generation hung out at the Gas House on Ocean Front Walk and at Venice West Cafe on Dudley.

Past gang activity
The Venice Shoreline Crips and the Latino Venice 13 (V-13) were the two main gangs active in Venice. V13 dates back to the 1950s, while the Shoreline Crips were founded in the early 1970s, making them one of the first Crip sets in Los Angeles. In the early 1990s, V-13 and the Shoreline Crips were involved in a fierce battle over crack cocaine sales territories.

By 2002, the numbers of gang members in Venice were reduced due to gentrification and increased police presence. According to a Los Angeles City Beat article, by 2003, many Los Angeles Westside gang members had resettled in the city of Inglewood.

Housing and homelessness
Venice Beach is one of the hardest places in the United States to build new housing due to stringent zoning regulations and pervasive NIMBYism. Between 2007 and 2022, not a single new house was built in Venice Beach.

As per a 2020 count, there were nearly 2,000 homeless people in Venice, up from 175 in 2014. Many of them take up residence in tents and tent cities. An LAPD official said that the increased homeless population has contributed to a spike in crimes in Venice in 2021, despite any statistically significant proof of correlation. In February 2020, the city opened a 154-bed transitional housing shelter at a former Metro bus yard.

Geography

City of Los Angeles
According to the City of Los Angeles, Venice is bounded on the north by the City of Santa Monica (Marine and Dewey Streets). On the west, it is bounded by the Pacific Ocean and on the east by Walgrove Avenue from the Santa Monica border to Venice Boulevard, Beethoven Street from Venice Boulevard to Zanja Street (including Venice High) and Del Rey Avenue from Zanja Street to Maxella Avenue. On the south, the boundary runs along Lincoln Boulevard to Admiralty Way, then south to Ballona Creek – including the Marina Peninsula community but excluding Marina del Rey.
 Venice borders the Palms, Mar Vista, and Del Rey neighborhoods, parts of Culver City and Marina del Rey.

According to the Venice Neighborhood Council, Venice consists of the eight existing neighborhoods listed in the Venice Specific Plan  – Silver Strand, Oxford Triangle, Marina Peninsula, Silver Triangle, North Venice, South Venice, Presidents Row, Venice Canals, Oakwood, North OFW (Ocean Front Walk), NoRo (North of Rose Avenue) and Penmar – plus the additional neighborhood of East of Venice.

Mapping L.A. 
According to the Mapping L.A. project of the Los Angeles Times, Venice is adjoined on the northwest by Santa Monica, on the northeast by Mar Vista, on the southeast by Culver City, Del Rey and Marina Del Rey, on the south by Ballona Creek and on the west by the Pacific Ocean.

Venice is bounded on the northwest by the Santa Monica city line. The northern apex of the Venice neighborhood is at Walgrove Avenue and Rose Avenue, abutting the Santa Monica Airport. On the east, the boundary runs north–south on Walgrove Avenue to the neighborhood's eastern apex at Zanja Street, thus including the Penmar Golf Course but excluding Venice High School. The boundary runs on Lincoln Boulevard to Admiralty Way, excluding all of Marina del Rey, south to Ballona Creek.

Cityscape

Venice Canal Historic District

Abbot Kinney Boulevard
Abbott Kinney Boulevard is a principal attraction, with stores, restaurants, bars and art galleries lining the street. The street was described as "a derelict strip of rundown beach cottages and empty brick industrial buildings called West Washington Boulevard," and in the late 1980s community groups and property owners pushed for renaming a portion of the street to honor Abbot Kinney. The renaming was widely considered as a marketing strategy to commercialize the area and bring new high-end businesses to the area.

Venice Farmers Market
Founded in 1987, the farmers market operates every Friday from 7 am to 11 am on Venice Boulevard at Venice Way.

72 Market Street Oyster Bar and Grill
72 Market Street Oyster Bar and Grill was one of several historical footnotes associated with Market Street in Venice, one of the first streets designated for commerce when the city was founded in 1905. During the depression era, Upton Sinclair had an office there when he was running for governor, and the same historic building where the restaurant was located was also the site of the first Ace/Venice Gallery in the early 1970s.

Historic post office

The Venice Post Office, a red-tile-roofed 1939 New Deal building designed by Louis A. Simon on Windward Circle, featured one of two remaining murals painted in 1941 by Modernist artist Edward Biberman. Developer Abbot Kinney is in the center surrounded by beachgoers in old-fashioned bathing suits, men in overalls, and a wooden roller coaster representing the Venice Pier on one side with contrasting industrial oil derricks that were once ubiquitous in the area on the other side. Senior curator of American Art at Los Angeles County Museum of Art (LACMA), Ilene Susan Fort, said this is one of the better New Deal post office murals both artistically and historically. Although it contains brightly colored elements with amusing details, the intrusion of the ominous oil rigs and wells was very relevant at the time.

After the post office closed in 2012, movie producer Joel Silver unveiled plans to purchase it for 7.5 million and revamp the building as the new headquarters of his company, Silver Pictures. The sale included the stipulation that he, or any future owner, preserve the New Deal-era murals and allow public access. Restoration of the nearly pristine mural took over a year and cost about $100,000. LACMA highlighted the mural with an exhibit that displayed additional Biberman artworks, rare historical documents and Venice ephemera with the restored mural. Silver has a long-term lease on the mural that is still owned by the US Postal Service. In May 2019, according to the Hollywood Reporter, Silver sold the building for 22.5 million to U.K. investor Alex Dellal and his real estate group founded by Jack Dellal. Status of the planned renovation remains subject to further approvals. The mural's whereabouts are unknown, putting the lessee in violation of the lease agreement's public access requirement.

Residences and streets
Many of Venice's houses have their principal entries from pedestrian-only streets and have house numbers on these footpaths. (Automobile access is by alleys in the rear.) The inland walk streets are made up primarily of around 620 single-family homes. Like much of the rest of Los Angeles, however, Venice is known for traffic congestion.

Venice Beach 
Venice Beach, which receives millions of visitors a year, has been labeled as "a cultural hub known for its eccentricities" as well as a "global tourist destination". It includes the promenade that runs parallel to the beach, the Venice Beach Boardwalk, Muscle Beach, and the Venice Beach Recreation Center with handball courts, paddle tennis courts, a skate dancing plaza, and numerous beach volleyball courts. It also includes a bike trail and many businesses on Ocean Front Walk.

The basketball courts in Venice are renowned across the country for their high level of streetball; numerous professional basketball players developed their games or have been recruited on these courts.

Venice Beach will host skateboarding and 3x3 basketball during the 2028 Summer Olympics.

Along the southern portion of the beach, at the end of Washington Boulevard, is the Venice Fishing Pier. A  concrete structure, it first opened in 1964, was closed in 1983 due to El Niño storm damage, and re-opened in the mid-1990s. On December 21, 2005, the pier again suffered damage when waves from a large northern swell caused part of it to fall into the ocean. The pier remained closed until May 25, 2006, when it was re-opened after an engineering study concluded that it was structurally sound.The Venice Breakwater is an acclaimed local surf spot in Venice. It is located north of the Venice Pier and lifeguard headquarters and south of the Santa Monica Pier. This spot is sheltered on the north by an artificial barrier, the breakwater, consisting of an extending sand bar, piping, and large rocks at its end.

In late 2010, the Los Angeles County Board of Supervisors conducted a $1.6 million replacement of 30,000 cubic yards of sand at Venice Beach eroded by rainstorms in recent years. Although Venice Beach is located in the city of Los Angeles, the county is responsible for maintaining the beach under an agreement reached between the two governments in 1975.

Oakwood

Oakwood lies inland from the tourist areas and is one of the few historically African-American areas in West Los Angeles.

East of Lincoln 
East of Lincoln is separated from Oakwood by Lincoln Boulevard. It extends east to the border with Mar Vista. Aside from the commercial strip on Lincoln (including the Venice Boys and Girls Club and the Venice United Methodist Church), the area almost entirely consists of small homes and apartments as well as Penmar Park and (bordering Santa Monica) Penmar Golf Course.

A housing project, Lincoln Place Apartment Homes, built by the Housing Authority of the City of Los Angeles, is currently undergoing a $140 million renovation to add 99 new market-rate apartment homes and to update the remaining 696 existing homes. A new pool, two-story fitness center, resident park and sustainable landscaping are being added. Aimco, which acquired the property in 2003, had previously been in a legal battle to determine whether or not Lincoln Place could be demolished and rebuilt. In 2010, Aimco settled with tenants and agreed to reopen the project and return scores of evicted residents to their homes and add hundreds of units to the Venice area.

Venice Walk Streets  
The Venice Walk Streets are three pedestrian-only residential streets.  

The streets are Marco Place, Amoroso Place and Nowita Place, located west of Lincoln Boulevard and east of Shell Avenue.

Los Angeles recognizes a larger North Venice Walk Streets Historic District.   

“The walk streets, narrower than regular streets, are too small for regulation street sweepers," so the streets had a designated smaller-size street sweeper.

Subsections
According to the Venice Neighborhood Council, the area can be subdivided further into the following districts:
 Ballona Lagoon West Bank
 Ballona Lagoon (Grand Canal) East Bank
 Silver Strand
 Marina Peninsula
 Venice Canals
 North Venice
 Oakwood-Milwood-South Venice
 Oxford Triangle

Climate

Like much of the rest of coastal southern California, Venice has a warm-summer Mediterranean climate, with mild, wet winters and warm, dry summers. Temperatures are moderate all year, and the neighborhood boasts over 300 sunshine days per year. As a result of seasonal lag, fall is usually warmer than spring in Venice. Because of its coastal location, morning fog is a common phenomenon in May and June, but occasionally July and August, as well. Los Angeles residents have a particular terminology for this phenomenon: the "May Gray", the "June Gloom", "No-Sky July" and "Fogust"; during these events, the fog will usually burn off by noon, but the fog may also linger all day. The all-time record high of 110 °F (43 °C) was observed on September 27, 2010, while the all-time record low is 32 °F (0 °C), recorded on January 14, 2007. Venice is in USDA plant hardiness zone 10b, closely bordering on 11a.

Demographics

The 2000 U.S. census counted 37,705 residents in the 3.17-square-mile Venice neighborhood—an average of 11,891 people per square mile, about the norm for Los Angeles; in 2008, the city estimated that the population had increased to 40,885. The median age for residents was 35, considered the average for Los Angeles; the percentages of residents aged 19 through 49 were among the county's highest.

The ethnic breakdown was 64.2% Non-Hispanic White, 21.7% Latino (of any racial origin); 5.4% African American; 4.1% Asian, and 4.6% of other origins. About 22.3% of residents had been born abroad, a relatively low figure for Los Angeles; Mexico (38.4%) and the United Kingdom (8.5%) were their most common places of birth.

Forty-nine percent of Venice residents aged 25 and older had earned a four-year degree by 2000, a high figure for both the city and the county. The percentages of residents of that age with a bachelor's degree or a master's degree was considered high for the county.

The median yearly household income in 2008 dollars was $67,647, a high figure for Los Angeles. The percentage of households earning $125,000 was considered high for the city. The average household size of 1.9 people was low for both the city and the county. Renters occupied 68.8% of the housing stock and house- or apartment owners held 31.2%. Property values have been increasing lately due to the presence of technology companies such as Google Inc. (which in 2011 began leasing 100,000 square feet of space in Venice) and Snap Inc. (which formerly leased property on Market Street and Abbot Kinney).

The percentages of never-married men (51.3%), never-married women (40.6%), divorced men (11.3%) and divorced women (15.9%) were among the county's highest. The percentage of veterans who had served during the Vietnam War was among the county's highest.

Arts and culture

Venice has been known as a preferred location for creative artists. In the 1950s and 1960s, Venice became a center for the Beat generation and there was an explosion of poetry and art, which continues today. Major writers and artists throughout the decades have included Stuart Perkoff, John Thomas, Frank T. Rios, Tony Scibella, Lawrence Lipton, John Haag, Saul White, Millicent Borges Accardi Robert Farrington, Philomene Long, and Tom Sewell.

Architecture
Originally established as a planned city imitating Venice, Italy, Venice is home to a large number of early 1900s buildings built in to emulate Italian renaissance architecture. Particularly along Windward Avenue, where an arched arcade covers the sidewalks on portions of both sides of the street. Similar buildings originally formed a continuous arcade from the boardwalk to the former lagoon (now the Windward traffic circle) but these were condemned by the City of Los Angeles after annexation. Only through the efforts of local preservationists were the few buildings that remain able to be preserved, although many were substantially modified.

Designers Charles and Ray Eames had their offices at the Bay Cities Garage on Abbot Kinney Boulevard from 1943 on, when it was still part of Washington Boulevard; Eames products were also manufactured there until the 1950s. The brick building's interior was redesigned by Frank Israel in 1990 as a creative workspace, opening up the interior and creating sightlines all the way through the building.

Originally located at the Venice home of Pritzker Prize–winning architect and SCI-Arc founder Thom Mayne, the Architecture Gallery was in existence for just ten weeks in 1979 and featured new work by then-emerging architects Frank Gehry, Eric Owen Moss, and Morphosis. Constructed on a long, narrow lot in 1981, the Indiana Avenue Houses/Arnoldi Triplex was designed Frank Gehry in partnership with artists Laddie John Dill and Charles Arnoldi. Frank Gehry has designed several well-known houses in Venice, including the Jane Spiller House (completed 1979) and the Norton House (completed 1984) on Venice Beach. In 1994, sculptor Robert Graham designed a fortress-like art studio and residence for himself and his wife, actress Anjelica Huston, on Windward Avenue.

Art
In the 1970s, performance artist Chris Burden created some of his early, groundbreaking work in Venice. Other notable artists who maintained studios in the area include Charles Arnoldi, Jean-Michel Basquiat, John Baldessari, Larry Bell, Billy Al Bengston, James Georgopoulos, Dennis Hopper, and Ed Ruscha. Organized by the Hammer Museum over the course of one weekend in 2012, the open-air Venice Beach Biennial (in reference to the Venice Biennale in Italy) brought together 87 artists, including site-specific projects by established artists like Evan Holloway, Barbara Kruger as well as boardwalk veteran Arthure Moore. In the 1980s and 1990s, the Venice Beach boardwalk became a mecca for street performances, turning it into a popular tourist attraction. Chainsaw jugglers, break dancers, acrobats and comics like Michael Colyar could be seen on a daily basis. Many performers like the Jim Rose Circus got their start on the boardwalk.

Venice Boardwalk murals 
The Venice Beach boardwalk area is known for its many famous murals by local artists, including Rip Cronk, Jonas Never, and Levi Ponce.  The following is a list of the most notable and iconic boardwalk murals:

 Venice Kinesis (2010) by Rip Cronk [a revision of earlier Venice Reconstituted (1989)]
 Homage to a Starry Knight (1990) by Rip Cronk
 Endangered Species (1990) by Emily Winters
 Venice Beach (1990) by Rip Cronk
 Morning Shot (1991) by Rip Cronk (portrait mural of musician Jim Morrison)
 Touch of Venice (2012) by Jonas aka "Never"
 Arnold Schwarzenegger (2013) by Jonas aka "Never" (portrait mural of Schwarzenegger in bodybuilding pose. 
 Luminaries of Pantheism (2015) by Levi Ponce (depicts pantheism supporters, including Einstein, Tesla, Du Bois, and others)

Venice Public Art Walls 

The Venice Art Walls were built in 1961 as part of the Venice Pavilion, a recreation and performing arts facility. It was a popular hangout spot for locals owing to its proximity to the beach and large number of concrete tables. The central area of the pavilion, known as "the pit" was surrounded by flat concrete walls that made for ideal painting surfaces. The pit became a hotbed of the growing graffiti movement in Los Angeles in the 1970s and 1980s, with many prominent artists and graffiti crews painting elaborate pieces on the pavilions walls. The area's thriving counterculture and arts scene, along with law enforcement's general neglect of the area made it an ideal location for artists to paint. Thirty-eight years later the Venice Pavilion was torn down but some of the walls, along with two large, conical concrete structures, were maintained. They were restored in 2000 as part of a renovation of the beachfront park area at the end of Windward Avenue, and ever since artists have been allowed to paint there freely and legally.

Music
Venice was where rock band The Doors were formed in 1965 by UCLA alumni Ray Manzarek and Jim Morrison. The Doors would go on to be inducted into the Rock and Roll Hall of Fame with Morrison being considered one of the greatest rock frontmen. Venice is the birthplace of Jane's Addiction in the 1980s. Perry Farrell, frontman and founder of Lollapalooza, was a longtime Venice resident until 2010.

Venice in the 1980s also had bands playing music known as crossover thrash, a hardcore punk/thrash metal musical hybrid. The most notable of these bands is Suicidal Tendencies. Other Venice bands such as Beowülf, No Mercy, and Excel were also featured on the compilation album Welcome to Venice.

Recreation and parks

The Venice Beach Recreation Center comprises a number of facilities. The installation has basketball courts (unlighted/outdoor), several children play areas with a gymnastics apparatus, chess tables, handball courts (unlighted), paddle tennis courts (unlighted), and volleyball courts (unlighted). At the south end of the area is the muscle beach outdoor gymnasium. In March 2009, the city opened a sophisticated $2 million skate park, the Venice Beach Skate Park, on the sand towards the north. The Graffiti Walls are on the beach side of the bike path in the same vicinity. 

The Oakwood Recreation Center, which also acts as a Los Angeles Police Department stop-in center, includes an auditorium, an unlighted baseball diamond, lighted indoor basketball courts, unlighted outdoor basketball courts, a children's play area, a community room, a lighted American football field, an indoor gymnasium without weights, picnic tables, and an unlighted soccer field.

The Westminster Off-Leash Dog Park is located in Venice.

Government

Venice is a neighborhood in the city of Los Angeles represented by District 11 on the Los Angeles City Council. City services are provided by the city of Los Angeles. There is a Venice Neighborhood Council that advises the LA City Council on local issues.

County, state, and federal representation
The Los Angeles County Department of Health Services SPA 5 West Area Health Office serves Venice.

The United States Postal Service operates the Venice Post Office at 1601 Main Street and the Venice Carrier Annex at 313 Grand Boulevard.

Education

The schools within Venice are as follows:

Broadway Elementary School, LAUSD, 1015 Lincoln Boulevard
Animo Venice Charter High School, 820 Broadway Street, which opened in August 2002 with 145 students, adding a freshman class of 140 every year until 2006, when it reached its full capacity of approximately 525 students. The school moved in 2006 to the former Ninety-Eighth Street Elementary School campus, which had been occupied by the Renaissance Academy.
Venice Skills Center, LAUSD, 611 Fifth Avenue
Westminster Avenue Elementary School, LAUSD, 1010 Abbot Kinney Boulevard
Coeur d'Alene Avenue Elementary School, LAUSD, 810 Coeur d'Alene Avenue
Westside Leadership Magnet School, LAUSD alternative, 104 Anchorage Street
Venice High School, LAUSD – The City of Los Angeles includes Venice High School in Venice, as does Google Maps, although Mapping L.A. places it in Mar Vista.

Infrastructure

Public libraries
The Los Angeles Public Library operates the Venice–Abbot Kinney Memorial Branch.

Fire department

The Los Angeles Fire Department operates Station 63, which serves Venice with two engines, a truck, and an ALS rescue ambulance.

Police
The Los Angeles Police Department serves the area through the Pacific Community Police Station as well as a beach sub-station.

Los Angeles County Lifeguards
Venice Beach is the headquarters of the Los Angeles County Lifeguards of the Los Angeles County Fire Department. It is located at 2300 Ocean Front Walk. It is the nation's largest ocean lifeguard organization with over 200 full-time and 700 part-time or seasonal lifeguards. The headquarters building used to be the City of Los Angeles Lifeguard Headquarters until Los Angeles City and Santa Monica Lifeguards were merged into the County in 1975.

Lifeguards also provide paramedic and rescue boat services to Catalina Island, with operations out of Avalon and the Isthmus.

Lifeguard Division employs 120 full-time and 600 seasonal lifeguards, operating out of three sectional headquarters, Hermosa, Santa Monica, and Zuma beach. Each of these headquarters staffs a 24-hour EMT-D response unit and are part of the 911 system. In addition to providing for beach safety, Los Angeles County Lifeguards have specialized training for Baywatch rescue boat operations, underwater rescue and recovery, swiftwater rescue, cliff rescue, marine mammal rescue and marine firefighting.

Notable people

Fiona Apple, singer-songwriter, pianist.
Jay Adams, professional skateboarder
J.C. Barthel, Venice postmaster and commissioner of supplies, 1920s, president of Chamber of Commerce
Charles Benefiel, artist
Millicent Borges Accardi, poet and writer, National Endowment for the Arts fellow and long-time Venice resident
Charles Winchester Breedlove, Los Angeles City Council member, 1933–45, supported legalized tango games
Bryan Callen, stand-up comedian, actor, writer and podcaster 
Brun Campbell, folk ragtime musician
Emilia Clarke, actress
John J. Coit, builder and operator of Venice Miniature Railway
Zack de la Rocha, musician
John Doan, classical guitarist
Tom Felton, actor, musician
Sky Ferreira, singer-songwriter, model, actress
C.H. Garrigues, journalist, Venice Vanguard
Lennon Sisters, singers
John Lovell, businessman, member of Los Angeles Common Council
John Lydon, "Johnny Rotten", lead singer of the Sex Pistols and Public Image Ltd
Helene Machado, All-American Girls Professional Baseball League player, born and raised in Venice
Milo Manheim, actor who stars as Zed in the Disney Channel Original Movies, Zombies and Zombies 2
Ian McShane, actor
Betty Miller, first female pilot to fly solo across the Pacific Ocean, born and raised in Venice
Berniece Baker Miracle, author and half-sister of Marilyn Monroe
Casey Neistat, filmmaker, vlogger, YouTuber
Anna Paquin, actress
James Edwin Richards, crime activist and citizen journalist, editor and publisher
Ronda Rousey, mixed martial artist, judoka, actress, and professional wrestler
Karl L. Rundberg, Los Angeles City Council member (1957–65), opposed Venice beatniks
Lila Shanley, stage name Lila Finn, stuntwoman, stunt double, and women's volleyball player
Joanie Sommers, singer
Teena Marie, singer-songwriter, producer

In popular culture

Venice has been the location of numerous movies, TV shows, and video games. Common locations for filming include the piers, skate park, restaurant, canals, boardwalk, and the schools.

Some productions include the following:
1914: Kid Auto Races at Venice (Charlie Chaplin—first appearance of the "Little Tramp" character)
1920: Number, Please? (Harold Lloyd)
1921: The High Sign (Buster Keaton)
1923: The Balloonatic (Buster Keaton)
1927: Sugar Daddies (Laurel and Hardy)
1928: The Circus (Charlie Chaplin)
1928: The Cameraman (Buster Keaton)
1958: Touch of Evil (Orson Welles) – shot entirely in Venice except for one indoor scene, selected by Welles as a stand-in for a fictional run-down Mexican border town.
1961: Night Tide (Dennis Hopper, Linda Lawson, written and directed by Curtis Harrington)—Shot entirely in Venice and shows the deteriorated nature of the area in the 1950s.
1972: One Pair of Eyes – Reyner Banham loved Los Angeles – architectural critic Reyner Banham explores Los Angeles in 1972.
1976: The Witch Who Came from the Sea (Millie Perkins, directed by Matt Cimber)
1979: CHiPs Roller Disco (Episodes 1 and 2 of season 3. Directed by Ron Weiss. Aired September 22, 1979)
1979: Roller Boogie (Linda Blair, directed by Mark L. Lester)
1988: Colors
1991: The Doors (Val Kilmer, directed by Oliver Stone)
1992: White Men Can't Jump
1993: Falling Down
1994: Speed (Keanu Reeves)
1997: Romy and Michele's High School Reunion
1998: The Big Lebowski
1998: American History X
2001: Dogtown and Z-Boys
2003: Thirteen (Holly Hunter)
2004: Grand Theft Auto: San Andreas as Verona Beach
2005: Lords of Dogtown
2006: Tenacious D in The Pick of Destiny
2007: Californication TV series
2010: Billionaire (Travie McCoy)
2011: Wilfred
2012: Amazing Race
2013: Grand Theft Auto V as Vespucci Beach
2013: Sugar
2013–2014: Sam & Cat
2009–2015: American Ninja Warrior
2014: Alex of Venice
2015: The Amazing Race 27
2016: Flaked
2017: Once Upon a Time in Venice
2017: Ingrid Goes West
2018: Humility
2020: Scoob!

See also

References

Further reading

 Street art pictorial works.
 History of Venice with 367 historic photographs.

External links

 
1905 establishments in California
Beaches of Los Angeles County, California
Beaches of Southern California
Busking venues
Former municipalities in California
Venice Beach
Neighborhoods in Los Angeles
Olympic surfing venues
Olympic basketball venues
Venues of the 2028 Summer Olympics
Parks in Los Angeles
Populated coastal places in California
Seaside resorts in California
Westside (Los Angeles County)

Historical Marker Database website